Horești is a commune in Fălești District, Moldova, near the border with Romania, about  to the north of Iași. It is composed of three villages: Horești, Lucăceni and Unteni.

Notable people
 Constantin Osoianu 
 Valentina Buliga

References

Communes of Fălești District
Populated places on the Prut
Populated places established in 1538
1538 establishments in Europe